The Refreshments can refer to two different bands
 The Refreshments (U.S. band), a band from Arizona, United States
 The Refreshments (Swedish band), a band from Sweden